This is a list of foreign-style castles in Japan. In Japan, the word '城(shiro) has broader meanings than western world, so this list includes the buildings near to fortresses.

Korean style castles

Chinese style castle

Portuguese style castle

French style castles

French style bastion fort

Japanese castles with French-style buildings 

 Other Japanese castles stationed by French style Japanese troops includes Sakura Castle, Utsunomiya Castle, Takasaki Castle, Sendai Castle, Kanazawa Castle, Osaka Castle, Himeji Castle, Hiroshima Castle, Marugame Castle, Kumamoto Castle, Kokura Castle, and Fukuoka Castle.

English style castle

Japanese castles with English-style buildings

Notes

References 
 
  - リンクは九州国立博物館「西都 太宰府」資料観覧ライブラリー。

See also 
Chashi—fortifications built by Ainu people
Gusuku—the castles of the Ryūkyū Kingdom
List of castles
List of castles in Japan
List of Japanese castles utilised by foreign troops
List of tenshu-style buildings outside of Japan

Lists of castles in Japan